The State Archives of San Marino are the national archives of San Marino.

The date back to 1600, and in the modern form from 1949, with a law on archives dating to 1978.

See also 

 List of national archives

External links

San Marino
Sammarinese culture
History of San Marino